Thomas Beville may refer to:

Thomas Beville (MP for Helston) in 1397, MP for Helston
Thomas Beville (MP for Huntingdonshire), 1413–1417, MP for Huntingdonshire